Greater Sudbury Utilities Inc. (GSU) delivers utility services in the area of Greater Sudbury, Ontario.  Its sole shareholder is the City of Greater Sudbury.  

Greater Sudbury Hydro Inc. and West Nipissing Energy Services Ltd. are subsidiaries of Greater Sudbury Utilities Inc.

External links
City of Greater Sudbury press release on GSU

Companies based in Greater Sudbury
Municipal government of Greater Sudbury
Electric power companies of Canada
Companies owned by municipalities of Canada